A pet peeve, pet aversion, or pet hate is a minor annoyance that an individual finds particularly irritating to them, to a greater degree than would be expected based on the experience of others.

Origin of the concept
The noun peeve, meaning an annoyance, is believed to have originated in the United States early in the twentieth century, derived by back-formation from the adjective peevish, meaning "ornery or ill-tempered", which dates from the late 14th-century.

The term pet peeve was introduced to a wide readership in the single-panel comic strip The Little Pet Peeve in the Chicago Tribune during the period 1916–1920. The strip was created by cartoonist Frank King, who also created the long-running Gasoline Alley strip. King's "little pet peeves" were humorous critiques of generally thoughtless behaviors and nuisance frustrations. Examples included people reading the inter-titles in silent films aloud, cracking an egg only to smell that it's gone rotten, back-seat drivers, and rugs that keep catching the bottom of the door and bunching up. King's readers submitted topics, including theater goers who unwrap candy in crinkly paper during a live performance, and (from a 12 year old boy) having his mother come in to sweep when he has the pieces of a building toy spread out on the floor.

Current usage and examples
Pet peeves often involve specific behaviors of someone close, such as a spouse or significant other. These behaviors may involve disrespect, manners, personal hygiene, relationships, and family issues. A key aspect of a pet peeve is that it may well seem acceptable or insignificant to others, while the person is likewise not bothered by things that might upset others. For example, a supervisor may have a pet peeve about people leaving the lid up on the copier, when others interrupt when speaking, or their subordinates having messy desks.

References

External links
 Word Detective Origins of Pet Peeve

Human behavior
English phrases